There have been six baronetcies created for persons with the surname Price, one each in the baronetages of England and of Great Britain and four in the baronetage of the United Kingdom. Two of the creations were extant as of 2008.

Price baronets of the Priory (1657)
Sir Herbert Price, 1st Baronet (–1678)
Thomas Arden Price, 2nd Baronet (1642–)

The Price Baronetcy, of the Priory, Brecon, was created in the baronetage of England in October 1657 for Herbert Price. The title became extinct upon the death of his son Thomas Arden Price .

Price baronets of Jamaica (1768)
Sir Charles Price, 1st Baronet (1708–1772)
Sir Charles Price, 2nd Baronet (–1788)

The Price Baronetcy, of Jamaica in the West Indies, was created in the baronetage of Great Britain on 13 August 1768 for Charles Price, Speaker of the House of Assembly of Jamaica. He was the grandson of Francis Price, who settled in Jamaica in the 1650s. The second baronet also served as Speaker of the House of Assembly of Jamaica. The title became extinct on his death in 1788.

Price, later Rugge-Price baronets, of Spring Grove (1804)
see Rugge-Price baronets

The Price, later Rugge-Price Baronetcy, of Spring Grove in Richmond, Surrey, was created in the baronetage of the United Kingdom on 2 February 1804.

Price baronets of Trengwainton (1815)

Sir Rose Price, 1st Baronet (1768–1834)
Sir Charles Dutton Price, 2nd Baronet (1800–1872)
Sir Rose Lambart Price, 3rd Baronet (1837–1899)
Sir Rose Price, 4th Baronet (1878–1901)
Sir Francis Caradoc Rose Price, 5th Baronet (1880–1949)
Sir Rose Francis Price, 6th Baronet (1910–1979)
Sir Francis Caradoc Rose Price, 7th Baronet, KC (born 1950)

The Price Baronetcy, of Trengwainton in the County of Cornwall, was created in the baronetage of the United Kingdom on 30 May 1815 for Rose Price. He was the grandson of John Price, younger brother of the first baronet of the 1768 creation. Henry Talbot Price, younger brother of the third baronet, was a captain in the Royal Navy. John Giles Price, fourth son of the first baronet, was a magistrate and penal administrator whose eldest son Sir John Frederick Price KCSI was a Madras Legislative representative, and whose third son was Col. Thomas Caradoc Rose Price. The latter's son Thomas Rose Price (1875–1949) was a brigadier-general whose younger son was the actor Dennis Price.

The heir presumptive to the baronetcy was, until his death on 27 February 2016, Norman William Rose Price (born 1953), 2nd and youngest son of the 6th Baronet; it is now his (Norman W R Price's) eldest son, Benjamin William Rose Price (born 1989).

Price baronets of Foxley (1828)
Sir Uvedale Price, 1st Baronet (1747–1829)
Sir Robert Price, 2nd Baronet (1786–1857)

The Price Baronetcy, of Foxley in the County of Hereford, was created in the baronetage of the United Kingdom on 12 February 1828 for Uvedale Price, best known for his writings on the Picturesque. His only son, the second baronet, sat as Member of Parliament for Herefordshire. The title became extinct on his death in 1857.

Price baronets of Ardingly (1953)
Sir Henry Philip Price, 1st Baronet (1877–1963)

The Price Baronetcy, of Ardingly in the County of Sussex, was created in the baronetage of the United Kingdom on 2 July 1953 for Henry Price, founder member of the Royal Institute of International Affairs. The title became extinct on his death in 1963.

See also
Pryce baronets
Pryce-Jones baronets
Pryse baronets

References

Further reading
Kidd, Charles & Williamson, David (editors). Debrett's Peerage and Baronetage (1990 edition). New York: St Martin's Press, 1990

Baronetcies in the Baronetage of the United Kingdom
Extinct baronetcies in the Baronetage of England
Extinct baronetcies in the Baronetage of Great Britain
Extinct baronetcies in the Baronetage of the United Kingdom